Mizzy may refer to:

Vic Mizzy (1916–2009), American composer for television and movies
Mizzy, artistic name of Maltese-British model, interior designer and artist Suzanne Mizzi (1967–2011)
Mizzy Kusuda, a character from the Japanese Manga series Harlem Beat
"Mizzy" Pacheco, former lead singer for American alternative rock band Against All Will